Historic District A is a national historic district located at Boonville, Cooper County, Missouri.  It encompasses 15 contributing buildings associated directly or indirectly with the Kemper Military School and College. The district includes the Kemper Administration Complex (1842-1904), "A" Barracks (1909), "D" Barracks (1916-1918), Johnston Field House and Pool Annex (1923-1925), Math Hall (1905-1906), Lamar Residence (1858-1860), Darby Residence (1858-1860), Dillender Residence (1895), Bertha Hitch Hall (c. 1854), and Kusgen-Melkersman Residence (1890-1910).

It was listed on the National Register of Historic Places in 1983.

References

Historic districts on the National Register of Historic Places in Missouri
National Register of Historic Places in Cooper County, Missouri
University and college campuses in Missouri
University and college buildings on the National Register of Historic Places in Missouri
Military history of Missouri
Boonville, Missouri